This is a list of active and extinct volcanoes in the Democratic Republic of the Congo.

Volcanoes

References 

Congo, Democratic Republic of
 
Volcanoes